Bodrež is a settlement in the Municipality of Šmarje pri Jelšah in eastern Slovenia. It lies in the hills south of Šentvid pri Grobelnem. The area is part of the historical region of Styria. In 2007 it was included in the Savinja Statistical Region of Slovenia.

References

External links
Bodrež at Geopedia

Populated places in the Municipality of Šmarje pri Jelšah